Society Smugglers is a 1939 American crime film directed by Joe May and starring Preston Foster, Irene Hervey and Walter Woolf King. It was made and distributed by Universal Pictures. The film sets were designed by the art director Jack Otterson.

Cast
 Preston Foster as Sully  
 Irene Hervey as Joan Martin  
 Walter Woolf King as Massey  
 Frank Jenks as Emery  
 Fred Keating as Larry Kearns  
 Regis Toomey as Johnny Beebe  
 Frances Robinson as Mary Larson  
 Raymond Parker as Ames  
 Clay Clement as Harrison  
 Doris Rankin as Miss Wexley  
 Harry Hayden as Dr. Lee 
 Frank Reicher as Jones 
 Milburn Stone as Peter Garfield  
 Jack Norton as Prentis  
 Michael Mark as Rug Merchant  
 George Lynn as Austin  
 Eddie Acuff as Radio Expert  
 Mary Field as Secretary
 James Baker as Plainclothesman  
 Frank Bischell as Newsboy 
 Heinie Conklin as Mailman  
 Kernan Cripps as Detective 
 Robert Darrell as Radio Technician 
 Edward Earle as Customs Officer 
 Billy Engle as Patient 
 Douglas Evans as Radio Announcer  
 Eddie Fetherston as Steward 
 Allen Fox as Photographer  
 Eddie Hall as Taxi Cab Driver 
 Sibyl Harris as Matron  
 Ben Lewis as Jeff 
 Gerald Mohr as Footman  
 Lyle Moraine as Cabin Boy  
 Christiane Tourneur as Claire  
 Emmett Vogan as Clemons  
 Max Wagner as Taxi Driver

References

Bibliography
 Monaco, James. The Encyclopedia of Film. Perigee Books, 1991.

External links
 

1939 films
1939 crime films
American crime films
Films directed by Joe May
Universal Pictures films
American black-and-white films
1930s English-language films
1930s American films